Concepción Cabrera de Armida  (December 8, 1862, in San Luis Potosí, Mexico - March 3, 1937, in Mexico City) was a Mexican Catholic mystic and writer.

She is also referred to as María Concepción Cabrera Arias de Armida, sometimes as Conchita Cabrera de Armida or Conchita Cabrera Arias de Armida, and often simply as Conchita.

She was beatified in Mexico City on 4 May 2019, as the first Mexican laywoman to receive this recognition.

Life 
She was born to Octaviano Cabrera Lacavex and Clara Arias Rivera, who had a respectable but not lavish family life. Although she recalled having frequently disobeyed her parents as a child, she showed a special love for the Holy Eucharist from an early age.

In 1884 she married Francisco Armida, with whom she had nine children between 1885 and 1899. In 1901, when she was 39 years old, her husband died and she had to care for her children, the youngest of whom was two years old. Her life as a widow was not made any easier by the fact that the Mexican Revolution raged from 1910 to 1921, taking the lives of 900,000 of Mexico's population of 15 million. Yet her writings reflect an amazing tranquility amid the chaos that surrounded her.

As a mystic, she reported that she heard God telling her: "Ask me for a long suffering life and to write a lot... That's your mission on earth". She never claimed direct visions of Jesus and Mary but spoke of Jesus through her prayers and meditations.

Her spiritual life started before the death of her husband. In 1894 she took "spiritual nuptials" and in 1896 wrote in her diary: "In truth, after I touched God and had an imperfect notion of His Being, I wanted to prostrate myself, my forehead and my heart, in the dust and never get up again."

During her life her writings were examined by the Catholic Church in Mexico and even during her pilgrimage to Rome in 1913 during which she had an audience with Pope Pius X. Church authorities looked favorably upon her writings.

Her writings were widely distributed and inspired the establishment of the "Works of the Cross" in Mexico:  
 Apostleship of the Cross founded in 1895, 
 Congregation of Sisters of the Cross of the Sacred Heart of Jesus founded in 1897, 
 Covenant of Love with the Heart of Jesus founded in 1909, 
 The Fraternity of Christ the Priest founded in 1912, and 
 The Congregation of Missionaries of the Holy Spirit founded in 1914.

These works continue today.

Writings 
Her children report that they hardly ever saw her in the process of writing, but her religious writings and meditations total over 60,000 handwritten pages. The length of her religious writings thus approaches that of Saint Thomas Aquinas.

As a writer, she often aimed to show her readers how to love the Catholic Church: 
To love the Church is not to criticize her, not to destroy her, not to try to change her essential structures, not to reduce her to humanism, horizontalism and to the simple service of a human liberation. To love the Church is to cooperate with the work of Redemption by the Cross and in this way obtain the grace of the Holy Spirit come to renew the face of this poor earth, conducting it to its consummation in the design of the Father's immense love.

In Seasons of the Soul she viewed the maturation of spiritual life as an ongoing process through the various seasons until the soul has fulfilled its purpose on earth. It discusses how the Holy Spirit is at work gradually transforming the soul through its seasons in the image and likeness of Jesus.

The book A Mother's Letters reflects the fact that she was not a cloistered mystic but a busy mother with nine children and a widow during a turbulent time in Mexico's political history. The letters provide a glimpse of her warm, human side as she communicates with her family.

Her other books include: To My Priests, Holy Hours, Before the Altar, You Belong to the Church and Irresistibly Drawn to the Eucharist.

"I Am": Eucharistic Meditations on the Gospel
"I Am": Eucharistic Meditations on the Gospel is a book of meditations written in 1912 by Conchita, the result of meditations during Eucharistic adoration. It aims to clarify the words with which Jesus defines Who He is in a variety of statements beginning with the words: "I am".

Her writings aim to clarify the words with which Jesus defines who he is in a variety of statements beginning with the words: "I am". The book thus aims to lead the reader to a better understanding of the mystery of Jesus Christ. These 31 meditations were originally published in 2001. They were inspired by a wide range of Gospel passages in which Jesus explains who he is in a variety of statements beginning with the words "I am".

Death
Conchita died on March 3, 1937, at the age of 74 and is buried at the Church of San José del Altillo in Mexico City. She had lived a multi-faceted life, being a mother, a widow, a mystic and a writer. Of herself she wrote:

I carry within me three lives, all very strong: family life with its multiple sorrows of a thousand kinds, that is, the life of a mother; the life of the Works of the Cross with all its sorrows and weight, which at times crushes me until I have no strength left; and the life of the spirit or interior life, which is the heaviest of all, with its highs and lows, its tempests and struggles, its light and darkness. Blessed be God for everything!

Beatification 
Her canonization process was started in 1959 by the Archbishop of Mexico City, at which time about 200 volumes of her writings were submitted to the Congregation for the Causes of Saints to be assessed. Pope John Paul II declared her as Venerable on December 20, 1999, and he began the process of beatification.

Pope Francis confirmed a miracle attributed to her intercession on 8 June 2018 (paving the way for her to be formally beatified), and Cabrera was beatified on 4 May 2019 in a ceremony which was held in Mexico City at the Basilica of Our Lady of Guadalupe.

See also

 I AM (book)
 Alexandrina of Balazar
 Maria Candida of the Eucharist
 Josefa Menéndez
 Faustina Kowalska
 Marguerite Bays
 Anne Catherine Emmerich
 Maria Valtorta
 Ottavio Michelini

Notes

Sources and external links
 Spanish Wikipedia
 Conchita: A Mother's Spiritual Diary
 Work of the Cross
 Blessed Concepcion Cabrera
 I Am: Eucharistic Meditations on the Gospel
 Seasons of the Soul
 Video about Cabrera de Armida at Museum House
 "I Am" at AlbaHouse

1861 births
1937 deaths
People from San Luis Potosí
Catholic laity
Roman Catholic mystics
19th-century venerated Christians
20th-century venerated Christians
Beatifications by Pope Francis
Mexican beatified people
Mexican Christian mystics
19th-century Christian mystics
20th-century Christian mystics
Venerated Catholics by Pope John Paul II
19th-century Mexican women writers
19th-century Mexican writers
20th-century Mexican women writers
20th-century Mexican writers